Naoto Miki born 8 May 2001 is a Japanese professional footballer who plays as a forward or a winger for Júbilo Iwata.

References

External links

2001 births
Living people
Japanese footballers
Association football forwards
Júbilo Iwata players
Fujieda MYFC players
J2 League players
J3 League players